Golle may refer to:

 Gölle, a village in Somogy county, Hungary
Golle, Niger, a village and rural commune in Niger